The giant horned lizard (Phrynosoma asio) is a species of phrynosomatid lizard which is endemic to the Pacific coast of southern Mexico. It is the largest horned lizard and is also the most slender (it has a typical lizard-like appearance). It is able to survive in the desert. The spines on its back and sides are made from modified scales, whereas the horns on its head are true horns (i.e., they have a bony core).

References

Phrynosoma
Fauna of Southern Mexico
Reptiles of Mexico
Reptiles described in 1864